Azamgarh Airport is an underconstruction airport at Manduri Village outside of Azamgarh city, near Kuan Devchand Patti, in the Indian state of Uttar Pradesh. It is being developed by upgrade of the existing government airstrip.

Proposed destination
As of now, Lucknow is the only destination which is proposed for direct flight from this airport under the Regional Connectivity Scheme UDAN.

See also
 UDAN
 Airports Authority of India

References

External links
 दूसरी किश्त वित्त स्वीकृति के संबंध में
 DETAILS OF AZAMGARH AIRPORT
 अब मंदुरी एयरपोर्ट से नए वित्तीय वर्ष में भर सकेंगे उड़ान
 तृतीय किश्त की धनराशि

Airports in Uttar Pradesh
Proposed airports in Uttar Pradesh
Transport in Azamgarh